The women's foil competition at the 2015 European Games in Baku was held on 24 June at the Crystal Hall 3.

Schedule
All times are local (UTC+5).

Results

Preliminaries

Pool A

Pool B

Pool C

Pool D

Pool E

Pool F

Knockout round

Final

Top half

Bottom half

References

External links

Women's individual foil